Amrowleh (also Romanized as Amrūleh and Hmrūllah; also known as ‘Amrollāh) is a village in Hoseynabad-e Jonubi Rural District, in the Central District of Sanandaj County, Kurdistan Province, Iran. At the 2017 census, its population was 420, in 106 families. The village is populated by Kurds.

References 

Towns and villages in Sanandaj County
Kurdish settlements in Kurdistan Province